John Bale (by 1531–61/62), of Bath, Somerset, was an English politician.

He was a Member (MP) of the Parliament of England for Bath in 1558.

References

Year of birth missing
1560s deaths
English MPs 1558
People from Bath, Somerset